Nguyên Bình may refer to several places in Vietnam:

Nguyên Bình District, a rural district of Cao Bằng Province
Nguyên Bình, Cao Bằng, a township and capital of Nguyên Bình District
, a ward of Nghi Sơn town

See also
Nguyen Binh (disambiguation)